The 1922–23 season was Maccabi Petah Tikva's 10th season since its establishment in 1913. As the local football association wasn't founded until July 1928, there were no officially organized competitions during the season, and the club played only friendly matches.

Overview
At the beginning of the season, the club was re-organized and was named after Avshalom Gissin, a former member of the club, who had been killed during the 1921 riots. During the season, the club took part in a cup competition which was called "The Hebrew Cup", and was eliminated in the quarter finals by Maccabi NesTziona. The club also took part in a league competition with other 7 clubs which was called Mis'chaki HaBechora (lit. The Premier Games), The league was completed during the following season.

Known Matches

The Hebrew Cup

Mis'chakei HaBechora

Table (as of 21 July 1923)

Matches

Known friendly matches

References

Maccabi Petah Tikva F.C. seasons
Maccabi Petah Tikva